Zen is a British television series produced by Left Bank Pictures for the BBC, co-produced with WGBH Boston for its Masterpiece anthology series, Mediaset and ZDF. It stars Rufus Sewell and Caterina Murino and is based on the Aurelio Zen detective novels by Michael Dibdin. The series was filmed on location in Italy, but the dialogue is in English. The series, which comprises three 90-minute films, was broadcast in the United Kingdom on Sunday evenings from 2 January 2011 on BBC One. The three films were based on the books Vendetta (1990), Cabal (1992) and Ratking (1988). The series was cancelled by BBC One in February 2011; BBC One controller Danny Cohen later said there were already enough male crime-fighters on TV. Left Bank, the show's producer, tried to find other broadcasters to fund another series but were unsuccessful.

Regular cast
Rufus Sewell as Aurelio ZenA smart and honest police detective in Rome who struggles to maintain his integrity amongst the bureaucracy and political interference in the department. He is in love with Tania Moretti, but long odds in the betting for who will sleep with her first. 
Caterina Murino as Tania MorettiOffice support worker for the squad. She is beautiful, smart and compassionate. She likes Zen and is trying to divorce her husband. 
Ben Miles as Amedeo ColonnaThe Minister's fixer. He is a powerful, connected and amoral man who believes that Zen is working for him, something that Zen encourages. 
Stanley Townsend as MoscatiZen's boss. He is a gruff, no nonsense man who does not suffer fools gladly. He is fond of Zen and Tania.
Francesco Quinn as Gilberto NiedduZen's ex-partner who now runs a private security business. The two have remained friends and Zen asks Gilberto for help when he needs advice or to go outside the department. 
Catherine Spaak as DonataZen's mother who was widowed when her husband was shot on the job. Zen moved in with her after he separated from his wife. She is wise, caring and concerned for her son.  
Vincent Riotta as Giorgio de AngelisA colleague whom Zen trusts. 
Ed Stoppard as Vincenzo FabriA detective with a powerful and wealthy uncle who is more interested in playing politics to advance his career than solving cases. 
Anthony Higgins as Eduardo GuerchiniThe Minister, who leaves all the dirty work to Colonna.
Cosima Shaw as Nadia PirloPowerful Prosecutor in the case against the cabal, who also tries to get romantically involved with Zen.

Complete main cast

Episodes

Series 1 (2011)

Series 1 was first shown in the USA on the PBS network: Vendetta, Cabal, and Ratking on 17, 24 and 31 July 2011, respectively.

References

External links
 
Zen from the Masterpiece website

2010s British crime drama television series
2011 British television series debuts
2011 British television series endings
BBC television dramas
2010s British television miniseries
Television series by Left Bank Pictures
Television series by WGBH
Television shows set in Italy
Television shows based on British novels
English-language television shows
Films directed by Jon Jones (director)